This is a timeline documenting events of Jazz in the year 1902.

Events

 Jelly Roll Morton start to get attention in the New Orleans scene, at the age of 17 years, as a brothel piano player. He primarily plays Ragtime and a little Blues at this point. He is one of the first to play this mix that is a forerunner of Jazz. He later claimed to have invented Jazz in this year by combining Ragtime, Quadrilles and Blues.

Standards

Births

 January
 3 – Preston Jackson, American trombonist (died 1983).
 9 – Mel Stitzel, German-American pianist, New Orleans Rhythm Kings (died 1952).
 13 – Putney Dandridge, African-American bandleader, jazz pianist and vocalist (died 1946).
 23 – Benny Waters, American saxophonist and clarinetist (died 1998).

 February
 6 – George Brunies, American trombonist (died 1974).

 March
 11 – Chauncey Morehouse, American drummer (died 1980).
 16 – Leon Roppolo, American clarinetist (died 1943).
 30 – Ted Heath, English musician and big band leader (died 1969).

 April
 6 – Rosy McHargue, American clarinetist (died 1999).
 24 – Rube Bloom, Jewish-American songwriter, pianist, arranger, band leader, singer, and author (died 1976).

 June
 6 – Jimmie Lunceford, American alto saxophonist and bandleader (died 1947).
 7 – Ed Cuffee, American trombonist (died 1959).
 17 – Chris Columbus, American drummer (died 2002).
 26 – Artemi Ayvazyan, Soviet-Armenian composer, conductor, and founder of the Armenian State Jazz Orchestra (died 1975).
 27 – Georg Malmstén, Finnish singer, musician, composer, orchestra conductor, and actor (died 1981).

 July
 4 – Erik Tuxen, Danish big band leader, composer, and arranger (died 1957).
 7 – Jim McCartney, English trumpeter and pianist (died 1976).
 19
 Buster Bailey, American clarinet, but also well versed on saxophone (died 1967).
 Cliff Jackson, American stride pianist (died 1970).
 21 – Omer Simeon, American clarinetist and reedist (died 1959).

 August
 21 – Lloyd Scott, American drummer and bandleader (died unknown date).

 September
 17 – Louis Nelson, American trombonist (died 1990).

 October
 12 – Jimmy Archey, American trombonist (died 1967).
 24 – Louis Barbarin, American drummer (died 1997).
 25 – Eddie Lang, American guitarist (died 1933).

 November
 29 – Danny Alvin, American drummer and bandleader (died 1958).

 December
 7 – Cecil Irwin, American reedist and arranger (died 1935).

 Unknown date
 Barney Josephson, founder of Café Society in Greenwich Village (died 1988).
 Shirley Clay, American trumpeter (died 1951).

References

External links
 History Of Jazz Timeline: 1902 at All About Jazz

Jazz, 1902 In
Jazz by year